USS Jordan (DE-204) was a  in service with the United States Navy from 1943 to 1945. Following a collision with a merchant vessel, she was not repaired and scrapped in 1947.

History
USS Jordan was named in honor of Lieutenant Julian Bethune Jordan (1904–1941), who was killed in action aboard  during the Japanese attack on Pearl Harbor on 7 December 1941.

Jordan was laid down on 5 June 1943 by the Charleston Navy Yard; launched on 23 August 1943; sponsored by Mrs. Lucy H. Jordan, widow of Lieutenant Jordan; commissioned on 17 December 1943.

After shakedown, Jordan arrived New York in mid-March 1944 for duty as convoy escort. She sailed on 17 April with a convoy bound for Gibraltar, arriving there on 1 May with transports carrying vital cargo for the operations in the Mediterranean area. She returned to New York later that month and made one more European voyage in June before beginning duty as a training ship. During July and August, she engaged in training exercises at Quonset Point, Rhode Island, and arrived Port Everglades, Florida, on 17 September to commence experimental exercises in that area.

After a yard period at Charleston Navy Yard, Jordan resumed sound experiments out of Port Everglades in early 1945.  During May, she was deployed on another cruise to the Mediterranean as convoy escort, returning to New York on 10 June. She engaged in submarine operations out of New London, Connecticut, and training exercises in Cuba, throughout the summer. It was through these experiments that new technological advancements in anti-submarine warfare were adopted, leading to a more powerful navy and a shorter war.

While on a training mission on 18 September, Jordan collided with a merchant vessel, SS John Sherman, necessitating immediate repairs. She arrived Charleston on 4 October and remained there until she decommissioned on 19 December 1945.  The ship was scrapped in 1947.

References

External links

 
 

Buckley-class destroyer escorts
Ships built in Charleston, South Carolina
World War II frigates and destroyer escorts of the United States
1943 ships